Muba Babel United Football Club (formerly known as Babel United) was an Indonesian football club based in Musi Banyuasin Regency, South Sumatra. The club played their home games at Serasan Sekate Stadium.

History 
In March 2020, Babel United and Muba United merged to form Muba Babel United.

In June 2022, Muba Babel United was acquired by Liga 3 side Persipal Palu. As a result, Muba Babel United ceased to exist as Persipal took over their spot in the 2022-23 Liga 2 season.

References

External links 
Liga-Indonesia.co.id

Football clubs in Indonesia
Football clubs in South Sumatra
Association football clubs established in 2020
Association football clubs disestablished in 2022
2022 disestablishments in Indonesia
2020 establishments in Indonesia
Sport in South Sumatra